Cosmic commonly refers to:
 The cosmos, a concept of the universe

Cosmic may also refer to:

Media 
 Cosmic (album), an album by Bazzi
 Afro/Cosmic music
 "Cosmic", a song by Kylie Minogue from the album X
 CosM.i.C, a member of the Swedish rap group Looptroop Rockers
 Cosmic, an album by Thomas Anders

Science 
 An electronic medical record software developed by Cambio
 Constellation Observing System for Meteorology, Ionosphere, and Climate
 COSMIC cancer database
 COSMIC functional size measurement

Other uses 
 Cosmic Top Secret, a category of classified information used by NATO
 Cosmic ocean, a mythological motif
 COSMIC, a desktop environment written in the Rust programming language

See also 
 Cosmic background (disambiguation)
 Cosmos (disambiguation)